Plesiothyreus cytherae is a species of sea snail, a marine gastropod mollusk in the family Phenacolepadidae.

Description
The length of the shell attains 15.5 mm.

Distribution
This marine species occurs off Tahiti.

References

External links
 Lesson R.P. (1830–1831). Voyage autour du monde, exécuté par ordre du Roi, sur la corvette de Sa Majesté, La Coquille, pendant les années 1822, 1823, 1824 et 1825. Zoologie, 2(1): 1–471 [pp. 1–24 (1830), 25–471 (1831)] Paris: Arthus Bertrand
 Broderip W.J. (1834). Description of a new genus of Gasteropoda. Proceedings of the Zoological Society of London. 2: 47–49
 Sowerby, G. B. III. (1910). Description of new species of Donovania, Pisania, Phenocolepas, and Fissurella. Proceedings of the Malacological Society of London. 9(1): 65–67
 Fukumori H., Yahagi T., Warén A. & Kano Y. (2019). Amended generic classification of the marine gastropod family Phenacolepadidae: transitions from snails to limpets and shallow-water to deep-sea hydrothermal vents and cold seeps. Zoological Journal of the Linnean Society. 185(3): 636–655

Phenacolepadidae
Gastropods described in 1831